Nagaraya (Japanese: ナガラヤ) is a snack food brand owned by Food Industries, Inc., a Philippine-based company. Its core product, Nagaraya Cracker Nuts, was first introduced in the Philippines in 1968. It is composed of peanuts encased in a wheat flour-based coating. The texture is similar to that of Wasabi peas, but with a nutty flavor and comes in five different flavor varieties. The product has no preservatives, colourants, non-natural additives, zero cholesterol and low sodium content (85mg or 4 percent). It is also worthy of note that it also has a fiber content of 1g or 4 percent of daily intake and 2% of iron. 

The brand is also used for the company's other snack food product, Nagaraya Sweet-Mini Pretzels, a biscuit stick snack similar to Pretz and Pocky.

Recalls
In 2014, according to the Food and Drug Administration, a particular batch of Nagaraya Cracker Nut Original Butter Flavor was recalled for suspected unacceptable amounts of aflatoxin.

See also
 Cracker nuts

References

Further reading
Nagaraya - Superbrands Philippines, Volume 4 (2005-2006), pages 72 and 73

External links
Nagaraya official website

Food brands of the Philippines
Products introduced in 1968